Rana Muhammad Ishaq Khan (born 5 October 1957) is a Pakistani politician belonging to Kasur the infamous district Bulleh Shah belonged to. Rana Muhammad Ishaq Khan was Mayor Kasur in 1997, has been a member of the National Assembly of Pakistan since 2008 for the third consecutive term. Currently is the Parliamentary Secretary for Finance and Revenue.

Early life
He was born on 5 October 1957.

Political career
His political career started in the late 1990s. He was elected as Mayor Kasur in 1997. He ran for the seat of the National Assembly of Pakistan as a candidate of the Pakistan Muslim League (N) (PML-N) from Constituency NA-141 (Kasur-IV) in the 2002 Pakistani general election but was unsuccessful. He received 42,518 votes and lost the seat to Muhammad Asif Nakai.  He was then elected tehsil nazim (Pattoki Tehsil) while being in opposition when the ruling party of punjab was Pakistan Muslim League (Q).

He was elected to the National Assembly for the first time as a candidate of the PML-N from Constituency NA-141 (Kasur-IV) in 2008 Pakistani general election. He received 58,807 votes and defeated Muhammad Asif Nakai.

He was re-elected to the National Assembly as a candidate of the PML-N from Constituency NA-141 (Kasur-IV) in the 2013 Pakistani general election. He received 96,737 votes and defeated Sardar Muhammad Asif Nakai.

He was elected again to the National Assembly as a candidate of the PML-N from Constituency NA-139 (Kasur-III) defeating PTI candidate Azeem ud din Lakhvi in the 2018 Pakistani general election. He is currently the Parliamentary Secretary for Finance and Revenue. 

His brother Rana Muhammad Hayat is a former member parliament from NA-142 (Kasur-V) 2013-2018. His cousin Rana Muhammad Iqbal Khan is currently a member of the provincial assembly and held the office of the speaker Punjab assembly for two consecutive terms from 2008-2018.

References

Living people
1967 births
Pakistani MNAs 2008–2013
Pakistani MNAs 2013–2018
Pakistan Muslim League (N) politicians
Pakistani MNAs 2018–2023